The Columbus micropolitan area may refer to:

The Columbus, Mississippi micropolitan area, United States
The Columbus, Nebraska micropolitan area, United States

See also
Columbus metropolitan area (disambiguation)
Columbus (disambiguation)